Verrell Yustin Mulia (born 6 August 2004) is an Indonesian badminton player.

Achievements

BWF International Challenge/Series (1 runner-up) 
Mixed doubles

  BWF International Challenge tournament
  BWF International Series tournament
  BWF Future Series tournament

BWF Junior International (2 runners-up) 
Boys' doubles

Mixed doubles

  BWF Junior International Grand Prix tournament
  BWF Junior International Challenge tournament
  BWF Junior International Series tournament
  BWF Junior Future Series tournament

References

External links 
 

2004 births
Living people
People from Jakarta
Indonesian male badminton players
21st-century Indonesian people